Digital5 is the online programming division of TV5 Network Inc. and currently headed by Chot Reyes, who also served as the chief of Sports5.

It produces content (also partnering with some productions) that will can be viewed on the network's online portals. Digital5's content include lifestyle, travel, news, business, sports, comedy, etc. It also managed the news portal, InterAksyon.com, together with News5. Digital5 also produced shows for GG Network, the first online network catered for electronic gamers.

Digital5 Programs
These are the programs produced by Digital5 (past, ongoing and upcoming) with its description

D5.studio
Aside from original programs, online re-runs of past and present TV5 shows are also uploaded in the website. Whenever possible, select Digital5 Programs are brought to TV5 as catch-up episodes (with short length online videos of the shows being combined for television and rearranged with playout to/from commercial breaks).

Baon Fix (Host: Patti Grandidge / Description: Quick Tips on Making a "Baon")
Bloom (Hosts: Mika Martinez, Maggie Wilson / Genre: Women Magazine)
Clash of Class (Description: Battle and Comparison)
Good Times with Mo: The Podcast (Hosts: Mo Twister and various co-hosts / Genre: Talk show on love & sex)
Jinrilationships: A Survival Guide to the Dating Life (Host: Jinri Park / Genre: Romantic-comedy)
Like A Bossing (Host: Anthony Pangilinan / Description: Magazine show about Entrepreneurs)
Kwentong Barbero (Mang Ponso / Genre: Typical comedy)
Phenoms (Starring: Kiefer Ravena and Alyssa Valdez / Genre: Reality)
 Spinnr Sessions (Genre: Live Music Sessions from various music artists)
Tanods (Starring: Martin Escudero, Jun Sabayton, Bea Benedicto, Jinri Park / Genre: Sitcom)
Forever Sucks (Starring: Jasmine Curtis-Smith, JC Santos, Ian Batherson / Genre: Drama)
Rock U (Genre: Animated series)
Bolero Rap Battles (Genre: Rap Battle League)

News5.com.ph

Kontrabando/Duty, Devotion and Service (Hosts: Ramon Bautista, Lourd de Veyra, Jun Sabayton and RA Rivera with Generoso Cupal, Bea Benedicto, Bart Bartolome, Epe Salas and Mackhie Suela (occasionally with Nikki Veron Cruz and Angel Francisco) / Genre: News Satire)
NewsRoom 5 (Hosts: Branden Milla and Bea Benedicto / Description: Human Interest Stories)

Sports5.ph
Philippine Basketball Association and Philippine Superliga games live streaming are also available in this website, with no commercial breaks.

The Bro Show (Hosts: Jason Webb, Richard del Rosario and Mico Halili / Description: Sports talk show)
Kicksplorer (Host: James Velasquez / Description: Kicks & Shoes Review)
Nth Degree (Hosts: Dominic Uy and Kevin Limjoco / Description: Consumer Reviews)
No Holds Barred: We Ask The Questions, You Get The Answers (Host: Quinito Henson / Description: In-depth interviews with sports personalities)
On Cam (Hosts: Apple David, Mara Aquino and Carla Lizardo / Description: Inside Look on the Player's Inner Sides)
Pinoy Wrestling Revolution
SELfie! (Host: Sel Guevara / Description: Sports on Social Media)
Sports5 Pre Game Show (aired before the PBA games)
The Perfect Round (Hosts: Dominic Uy and Cookie La'O / Description: Golf News)
They Call Me Coach (Host: Chot Reyes / Description: Basic Techniques on Coaching and interviews with renowned coaches from different sports)

GG Network
GG Stream Team

References

External links 
 TV5 
 Sports5 
 News5 Everywhere

TV5 Network
Streaming television